Fluoroacetic acid is a organofluorine compound with formula CH2FCO2H. It is a colorless solid that is noted for its relatively high toxicity.  The conjugate base, fluoroacetate occurs naturally in at least 40 plants in Australia, Brazil, and Africa. It is one of only five known organic fluorine-containing natural products.

Toxicity
Fluoroacetic acid is a harmful metabolite of some fluorine-containing drugs (median lethal dose, LD50 = 10 mg/kg in humans). The most common metabolic sources of fluoroacetic acid are fluoroamines and fluoroethers. Fluoroacetic acid can disrupt the Krebs cycle.

In contrast with monofluoroacetic acid, difluoroacetic acid and trifluoroacetic acid are far less toxic. Its pKa is 2.66, in contrast to 1.24 and 0.23 for the respective di- and trifluorinated acids.

Uses
Fluoroacetic acid is used to manufacture pesticides especially rodenticides (see sodium fluoroacetate). The overall market is projected to rise at a considerable rate during the forecast period, 2021 to 2027.

See also
 Difluoroacetic acid
 Trifluoroacetic acid

References

Carboxylic acids
Organofluorides
Halogen-containing natural products
Respiratory toxins
Fluorine-containing natural products
Aconitase inhibitors
 
Fluorinated carboxylic acids
Plant toxins